Christopher J. Malloy is an American economist currently the Sylvan C. Coleman Professor of Financial Management at Harvard Business School.

Education
PhD in Finance and MBA from The University of Chicago Graduate School of Business
BA in Economics from Yale University

References

Year of birth missing (living people)
Living people
American economists
Harvard Business School faculty
University of Chicago Booth School of Business alumni
Yale University alumni